Srednja Vas–Poljane is a village on the right bank of the Poljane Sora River, halfway between Poljane and Gorenja Vas in the Municipality of Gorenja Vas–Poljane in the Upper Carniola region of Slovenia.

Name
The name of the settlement was changed from Srednja vas to Srednja vas-Poljane in 1953.

Church
The local church, built on a hill above the main settlement, is dedicated to the Holy Cross. It was built in the 1730s in the Baroque style. It used to be particularly well known for its processions during lent. The main altar dates to 1777.

References

External links

Srednja Vas–Poljane on Geopedia

Populated places in the Municipality of Gorenja vas-Poljane